Vittorio Calcina (31 December 1847 – 31 December 1916) was the first Italian filmmaker in history.

Biography 
Born in Turin, Calcina was a photographer by profession, he was the Lumière brothers' representative for Italy from 1896. In that year:
 he was the creator of the first filming of a pope, when he immortalized Pope Leo XIII in the Vatican Gardens on 26 February 1896;
 on 23 October 1896, Calcina asked the municipality of Brescia for the concession of the San Luca Hospital to carry out, in the rooms of the "Forza e Costanza" gymnasium, the screening with cinematograph of Il bagno di Diana by Giuseppe Filippi;
 on 7 November 1896 he organized a screening of about 20 films by the Lumière brothers in the former Hospice of Charity in via Po 33 in Turin.
He then became the official photographer of the House of Savoy, the Italian ruling dynasty from 1861 to 1946. In this role he filmed the first Italian film, Sua Maestà il Re Umberto e Sua Maestà la Regina Margherita a passeggio per il parco a Monza (English: His Majesty the King Umberto and His Majesty the Queen Margherita strolling through the Monza Park), believed to have been lost until it was rediscovered by the Cineteca Nazionale in 1979.

He ended his career as a short film director in 1905, when he resumed the activity of representative of the Lumière brothers in Italy. He died in Milan and was buried in Turin.

Filmography 

List of films made by Calcina:
 1896: Sua Santità papa Leone XIII
 1896: Sua Maestà il Re Umberto e Sua Maestà la Regina Margherita a passeggio per il parco a Monza
 1897: Le principi di Napoli a Firenze
 1898: Varo della Emanuele Filiberto a Castellammare
 1898: L'entrata dell'esposizione di Torino
 1898: Ciclisti romani in arrivo a Torino
 1899: Il re alla rivista delle truppe reduci dalle grandi manovre l'8 settembre 1899
 1899: La passione di Cristo
 1900: Il corteo funebre di accompagnamento alla salma di re Umberto
 1901: La nave Stella Polare del Duca degli Abruzzi
 1905: Il terremoto in Calabria

See also 
 Cinema of Italy
 Lumière brothers

Notes

External links 

 
 
 
 

Italian filmmakers
History of film
Cinema pioneers
1847 births
1916 deaths